Kreuzlingen Hafen railway station is a railway station in Kreuzlingen, in the Swiss canton of Thurgau. It is an intermediate stop on the Lake line and is served by local trains only. It is one of four stations within the municipality of Kreuzlingen.

Services 
Kreuzlingen Hafen is served by the S1 and RE of the St. Gallen S-Bahn:

 RegioExpress: hourly service between Konstanz and Herisau.
 St. Gallen S-Bahn : half-hourly service between Schaffhausen and Wil via St. Gallen.

References

External links 
 
 

Railway stations in the canton of Thurgau
Swiss Federal Railways stations
Kreuzlingen